Narito ang Puso Ko (International title: Here is My Heart) is a Philippine television drama romance series broadcast by GMA Network. Directed by Enrico Quizon and Gina Alajar, it stars Jolina Magdangal, Raymart Santiago and James Blanco. It premiered on June 9, 2003 on the network's Telebabad line up replacing Kung Mawawala Ka. The series concluded on March 5, 2004 with a total of 175 episodes. It was replaced by Hanggang Kailan in its timeslot.

Cast and characters

Lead cast
 Jolina Magdangal as Antonina San Victores / Isabella Campuspos
 Raymart Santiago as Rodolfo Perez
 James Blanco as Santiago "Santi" Tatlonghari

Supporting cast
 Rosa Rosal as Dolores San Victores
 Eddie Garcia as Felipe San Victores
 Amy Austria as Elsa Campuspos
 Dina Bonnevie as Violeta San Victores
 Raymond Bagatsing as Joaquin San Victores
 Ariel Rivera as Amoroso San Victores
 Carmina Villarroel as Ava "Primavera" Grande
 Lilia Dizon as Leticia
 Karen delos Reyes as fake Antonina / Luzviminda Bautista
 Chanda Romero as Clara Bautista
 Mylene Dizon as Stella Bautista
 Benjie Paras as Boyong

Recurring cast
 Monsour del Rosario as Ernesto San Vicente
 Allan Paule as Allan
 Ricci Chan as Red
 Lara Melissa de Leon as Arlene
 Raven Villanueva as Janessa

Guest cast
 Princess Punzalan as Atty. Salgado
 Sharmaine Arnaiz as young Dolores San Victores
 Lander Vera Perez as Antonio San Victores
 Jay-R as Jay R
 Kyla as Melani
 Jim Pebanco as Edgar
 Malou de Guzman as Rodolfo's mother
 Phoemela Baranda as Esmeralda San Victores
 Ernie Zarate as Enrico
 Reggie Curly as a private investigator
 Arlene Tolibas as a floor manager
 Mel Kimura as Melani's assistant
 Czarina Lopez de Leon as Jonathan's ex-girlfriend

Accolades

References

External links
 

2003 Philippine television series debuts
2004 Philippine television series endings
Filipino-language television shows
GMA Network drama series
Philippine romance television series
Television shows set in the Philippines